Stafidokampos is a village in the municipal unit of Andravida, Elis, Greece. It is situated in a flat rural area, 2 km southeast of the centre of Andravida, 2 km west of Tragano, 2 km north of the river Pineios and 28 km northwest of Pyrgos. The Andravida Air Base is 2 km to the north.

Historical population

External links
Stafidokampos on GTP Travel Pages (in English and Greek)

References

Populated places in Elis